Ashley Kevin Nadesan (born 9 September 1994) is an English professional footballer who plays as a striker for Crawley Town.

Career

Horley Town
Born in Redhill, Surrey, He began his career at Combined Counties club Horley Town, leading their Youth side in both league and cup in the 2012–13 season, sometimes playing at centre-back. He graduated to the first team at Horley, and became a regular starter. He came to the notice of professional clubs towards the end of the 2014–15 season having scored a total of 99 goals for Horley in league and cup in the previous two seasons. Nadesan was also the Combined Counties top scorer for the 2015–16 season, scoring 45 goals in the Premier Division, having finished runner-up the previous season.

Fleetwood Town
He joined Fleetwood in July 2016 for an undisclosed sum, before making his Football League debut for Fleetwood in August 2017 against AFC Wimbledon.

He moved on loan to Carlisle United in January 2018. At the end of the 2017–18 season, Fleetwood exercised an option to extend Nadesan's contract by one year. He returned on loan to Carlisle United in August 2018.

Crawley Town
In May 2019 he moved to Crawley Town on a free transfer, signing a three-year contract. However, Nadesan missed much of the pre-season through an ankle injury. Nadesan made his Crawley debut on 13 August 2019, playing the first 60 minutes of a 3–2 EFL Cup win over Walsall, in which he scored and gained an assist. He scored his first league goal for Crawley on 29 December 2019; a right-footed equaliser in the 37th minute of a 1–1 draw at Grimsby Town. He appeared in 25 league matches during the 2019–20 season, and scored 5 goals.

Nadesan scored Crawley's second goal of a 3–0 FA Cup third round win over Premier League side Leeds United on 10 January 2021.

In June 2022 he signed a two-year contract with the club.

Style of play
Due to his goal-scoring ability, Nadesan has been compared to England international and fellow former Fleetwood Town forward Jamie Vardy. Knaphill manager Keith Hills said of him, "there's something about the way he plays, his ability and how he reads the game. He obviously scores goals and he's very quick and combines speed with agility."

Career statistics

References

1994 births
Living people
People from Redhill, Surrey
Footballers from Surrey
English footballers
Association football forwards
Horley Town F.C. players
Fleetwood Town F.C. players
Carlisle United F.C. players
Crawley Town F.C. players
English Football League players